Gompholobium burtonioides is a species of flowering plant in the family Fabaceae and is endemic to the south-west of Western Australia. This species was first formally described in 1844 by Carl Meissner in Lehmann's Plantae Preissianae. The specific epithet (burtonioides) means "Burtonia-like". (Burtonia is an earlier name for Gompholobium.)

Gompholobium burtonioides grows in swampy areas and on slopes in the Avon Wheatbelt, Esperance Plains, Jarrah Forest and Mallee biogeographic regions of south-western Western Australia.

References

burtonioides
Eudicots of Western Australia
Plants described in 1844
Taxa named by Carl Meissner